Najla Harrathi (5 february 2002) is a Tunisian footballer who plays as a goalkeeper for ASF Bouhajla and the Tunisia women's national team.

Club career
Harrathi has played for Bouhajla in Tunisia.

International career
Harrathi has capped for Tunisia at senior level, including a 4–0 friendly away win over the United Arab Emirates 6 October 2021.

See also
List of Tunisia women's international footballers

References

External links

2002 births
Living people
Tunisian women's footballers
Women's association football goalkeepers
Tunisia women's international footballers